The Yankee Candle Company (referred to simply as Yankee Candle) is an American manufacturer and retailer of scented candles, candleholders, accessories, and dinnerware. Its products are sold by thousands of gift shops nationwide, through catalogs, and online, and in nearly 50 countries around the world. The company operates just over 260 small-box format stores, located in malls across 43 U.S. states and Ontario, and is the largest candle manufacturer in the United States. The company is headquartered in South Deerfield, Massachusetts.

The Jarden Corporation agreed to buy Yankee Candle for $1.75 billion in the fall of 2013. In 2015, Newell Rubbermaid announced that it would acquire Jarden for over $15 billion of cash and stock.

History 

Yankee Candle Company was started in South Hadley, Massachusetts when Michael Kittredge, originally from Holyoke, Massachusetts, created his first scented candle, Christmas 1969, from melted crayons as a gift for his mother. Neighbors began expressing interest in buying his creations, and Kittredge began producing them in larger quantities. The company itself was founded with help from Donald MacIver and Susan Obremski, who were high school friends with Kittredge. MacIver helped fund the start-up business with earnings from his part-time job. Candle production grew considerably after Obremski's father devised a "heated room", which enabled cost-saving liquid wax deliveries at the first factory site in Holyoke. Obremski's invention of a turntable taper wheel allowed production to double, while at the same time decreasing the need for more labor hours. In 1975, she managed the first Yankee Candle Shop located where the Village Commons in South Hadley now stands.

The company slowly expanded and moved to South Deerfield in 1983.

After a cancer scare in 1993, Kittredge started handing the company over to a friend and employee. In 1998, he sold the company to New York-based private equity company Forstmann Little for $500 million. Forstmann took the company public in 1999, and in 2001, hired Craig Rydin as a CEO. Rydin launched a major advertising campaign and the line was picked up by mass retailers Linens-N-Things and Bed, Bath and Beyond, pushing sales to their highest levels yet. Kittredge remained the company's chairman emeritus.

During the summer of 2006, Yankee Candle purchased Illuminations, a Petaluma, California-based, multi-channel retailer of high quality candles and home accessories. Although the two companies were similar, the names were separated, with Illuminations being aimed at a different demographic. The Illuminations brand and web store were phased out in early 2009.

On February 6, 2007, the company was acquired by the private equity group of Madison Dearborn Partners LLC for approximately $1.6 billion.

The founder, Michael Kittredge, in a return to high quality manufacturing created Kringle Candle, with his son Michael (Mike).

In October 2012 Yankee Candle Europe launched their Consumer Direct website offering their products direct to consumers.

In 2013, Jarden acquired Yankee Candle. A further merger in 2016 saw Jarden purchased by Newell Rubbermaid and combined into the new company Newell Brands.

In 2017 Newell Brands acquired Smith Mountain Industries, makers of the Woodwick brand of candles.  Woodwick candles are now a premium brand sold by Yankee Candle. The candles have a wooden wick that crackles when burned, and use a blend of paraffin and soy wax to reduce spatter and residue.

Flagship store 

Yankee Candle's flagship store, which opened in 1982, is located in South Deerfield, Massachusetts. It features all available Yankee Candles as well as kitchen and home accessories, New England crafts, gifts and collectibles, a toy shop, picnic grounds and a "Bavarian Christmas Village" filled with decorated Christmas trees and a toy train that runs through to Santa's Workshop, where animated elves and an 'assembly line' for wooden vehicles surround Santa Claus's desk. Visitors can dip their own candles in a specially equipped area, make wax molds of their hands, or create their own unique candle. There is also a candle making museum and a Hillside Pizza cafe on site. The store was a beautiful place for a child to visit, where they could make their own candles, choose their own scents to mix and match.

A second flagship store was opened in Williamsburg, Virginia, in 2005. At , it was a popular tourist destination. The Williamsburg store closed for good in April 2021.

Outlet stores
Yankee Candle has a total of 55 outlet stores in the United States.

Products 
Yankee Candle Company markets an array of products, including candles of various scents and sizes, scented wax tarts, candle accessories, votive candles (samplers), votive candle holders, tart warmers, jar toppers (for use with the Housewarmer line of candles), reed diffusers, Electric Home Fragrance units (scented wall plug-ins), car scents, room sprays, Good Air products and more. They also periodically release a range of limited edition candles such as 'Chocolate Layer Cake'.

COVID-19 
Since the outbreak of the COVID-19 pandemic, social media users observed a correlation between increases in reported COVID-19 cases and negative reviews of Yankee Candle products. Individuals scraping review data of both scented and unscented candles on Amazon.com found an increase in negative reviews for scented candles, with the proportion of reviews complaining of a lack of aroma also growing. In comparison, unscented candles did not exhibit this pattern.

As one of the symptoms of COVID-19 is loss of smell, this suggests that the increase in positive cases is causing more consumers to be unable to smell their scented candles. This correlation has been called the "Yankee Candle Index".

See also 
Yankee Candle Co. v. New England Candle Co.

References

External links 

 

Candles
Newell Brands
Manufacturing companies based in Massachusetts
Companies based in Franklin County, Massachusetts
Deerfield, Massachusetts
Manufacturing companies established in 1969
1969 establishments in Massachusetts
Madison Dearborn Partners companies
Private equity portfolio companies
American brands
2013 mergers and acquisitions